Liechtenstein competed at the 1996 Summer Olympics in Atlanta, United States.

Results by event

Athletics
Women's Competition
 Manuela Marxer

Judo
Women's Competition
 Birgit Blum

References
Official Olympic Reports

Nations at the 1996 Summer Olympics
1996
1996 in Liechtenstein sport